Henry Legge may refer to:
Henry Bilson Legge (1708–1764), English statesman
Sir Henry Legge (courtier) (1852–1924), Paymaster of the Household to King George V